WJIE-FM (88.5 FM) is a radio station broadcasting a Contemporary Christian format. Licensed to Okolona, Kentucky, United States, the station serves the Louisville area. The station has been listener-supported since signing on.

History
The station went on the air as WJIE on January 1, 1988.

References

External links

JIE-FM
Radio stations established in 1988
1988 establishments in Kentucky
Contemporary Christian radio stations in the United States
JIE-FM